Hermitage, New South wales, is a civil parish of Tongowoko County, New South Wales. The town of Tibooburra is the only settlement in the parish.

Located at 29°22′57″S 142°01′09″E, the parish is on the traditional lands of Yarli peoples.
The Geography, of the parish is mostly the flat, arid landscape of the Channel Country. The parish has a Köppen climate classification of BWh (Hot desert).

The nearest town is Tibooburra

References

Parishes of Tongowoko County
Far West (New South Wales)